The 1910–11 season is the first season of competitive football by Ayr United F.C., following a merger of Ayr Parkhouse F.C. and Ayr F.C.

Overview
Prior to 1910 there were two clubs in Ayr, Ayr F.C. and Ayr Parkhouse. Talk of merger had been rife in Ayr for year before the clubs finally agreed to do so in 1910. The newly formed Ayr United sought election to the Scottish First Division, the assumption that this status would be granted was the main incentive which pushed the merger through.
The new club's home ground was Somerset Park, originally the home of Ayr FC from 1888, although Parkhouse’s former home, Beresford Park, remained in use by the club for reserve and local fixtures until the mid-1920s.
The new Ayr United F.C. played in a strip consisting of a crimson and gold hooped jerseys (Ayr F.C.) and navy blue shorts (Ayr Parkhouse).

Competitions

Pre season

Scottish League Division Two

League table

Results summary

Matches

Scottish Qualifying Cup

First round

Second round

Scottish Consolation Cup

First round

Second round

Third round

Fourth round

Fifth round

Semi-final

Ayrshire League

1909–10 Final

1910–11 Matches

1910–11 Final

Ayrshire Cup

Second round

Semi-final

Final

See also
 1910–11 in Scottish football
 1910–11 Scottish Division Two

References 

 Scottish Football Archive

Ayr United F.C. seasons
Ayr United